The Medal of Honor is the highest military decoration awarded by the United States government and is bestowed on a member of the United States armed forces who distinguishes himself "…conspicuously by gallantry and intrepidity at the risk of his life above and beyond the call of duty while engaged in an action against an enemy of the United States…" Due to the nature of this medal, it is commonly presented posthumously.

Many of the awards during the Civil War were for capturing or saving regimental flags. During the Civil War, regimental flags served as the rallying point for the unit, and guided the unit's movements. Loss of the flag could greatly disrupt a unit, and could have a greater effect than the death of the commanding officer.

Recipients are listed alphabetically by last name. Posthumous receipt is denoted by an asterisk.

Q

Recipients are listed alphabetically by last name. Posthumous receipt is denoted by an asterisk.

R

Recipients are listed alphabetically by last name. Posthumous receipt is denoted by an asterisk.

S

Recipients are listed alphabetically by last name. Posthumous receipt is denoted by an asterisk.

See also
 List of Medal of Honor recipients

Notes

References

 
 
 
 

Civil War Q-S
Military personnel of the American Civil War
Medal